The Philippine Senate Committee on Health and Demography is a standing committee of the Senate of the Philippines.

Jurisdiction 
According to the Rules of the Senate, the committee handles all matters relating to:

 Public health in general
 Medical, hospital and quarantine services
 Population issues, concerns, policies and programs affecting individuals and their families, and their effects on national, social and economic conditions

Members, 18th Congress 
Based on the Rules of the Senate, the Senate Committee on Health and Demography has 11 members.

The President Pro Tempore, the Majority Floor Leader, and the Minority Floor Leader are ex officio members.

Here are the members of the committee in the 18th Congress as of September 24, 2020:

Committee secretary: Beatriz Tiongco-Cruda

See also 

 List of Philippine Senate committees

References 

Health
Parliamentary committees on Healthcare